This is a list of ports in Ukraine.

Ukraine possesses the most powerful sea port potential among all the countries of the Black Sea and the Sea of Azov. There are 18 seaports located along the Ukrainian coast.

Sea ports
All the ports of Ukraine are managed by the Ukrainian Sea Ports Authority. In 2022, the majority of these ports were effectively closed to international ship traffic due to the ongoing Russian invasion of Ukraine and Russian naval blockade of the Black Sea. Odesa, along with to a lesser degree Chernomorsk and Yuzhne, have been partially open to limited convoy-based grain and ammonia (for fertilizer) exports under the UN-brokered Black Sea Grain Initiative.

Danube
 Port of Izmail
 Reni Commercial Seaport
 Port of Ust-Danube

Black Sea
 Port of Kherson
 Port of Sevastopol (closed)
 Port of Skadovsk

Crimea
 Port of Alushta
 Port of Feodosiya (closed)
 Port of Yalta (closed)
 Port of Yevpatoriya (closed)

Mikolaiv
Dnieper-Bug Sea Commercial Port
Mykolaiv River Port
 Port of Mykolaiv
 Sea Specialized Port Nika-Tera
 Specialized Seaport Olivia

Odesa
 Port of Bilhorod-Dnistrovsky
 Port of Chornomorsk
 Port of Izmail
 Port of Odesa
 Pivdennyi Port
 Reni Commercial Seaport
 Ust-Danube Commercial Seaport
 Port of Kiliya

Sea of Azov
 Port of Berdiansk
 Port of Kerch (closed) (Port Krym) 
 Kerch Seaport Komysh-Burun
 Port of Mariupol

Fishing ports
 Kerch Fishing Port
 Sevastopol Sea Fishing Port

River ports
 Cherkasy River Port
 Chernihiv River Port
 Dnipriany River Port
 Dnipropetrovsk River Port
 Kamianske River Port
 Kherson River Port
 Kremenchuk River Port
 Kyiv River Port
 Mykolaiv River Port
 Nikopol River Port
 Nova Kakhovka River Port
 Pereiaslav River Port
 Rzhyshchiv River Port
 Zaporizhzhia River Port

See also
Transport in Ukraine

References

External links

Ukraine